Adam Walker (1829 – 15 August 1902)  was a Member of the Queensland Legislative Assembly in Australia. He represented the seat of Balonne from 1873 to 1874.

References

Members of the Queensland Legislative Assembly
1829 births
1902 deaths
19th-century Australian politicians
English emigrants to colonial Australia